Rita Brara is an Indian sociologist, professor, author, and the editor of the academic journal Contributions to Indian Sociology.

She is the author of the 2006 book Shifting Landscapes: The Making and Remaking of Village Commons in India.

Education 
Brara has a 1990 PhD from the University of Delhi. Her thesis was Kinship in a Princely State: A Study of Malerkotla, India (1890-1990).

Career 

She has taught in the University of Delhi. She is currently a visiting professor/fellow at the Institute of Economic Growth in Delhi, and Ashoka University in Sonepat. Brara is the editor, and previously was the co-editor, of the journal Contributions to Indian Sociology.

She is the author of the 2006 book Shifting Landscapes: The Making and Remaking of Village Commons in India (ISBN 9780195673012).

Selected publications 

 Brara, Rita. 2021. Introduction. In Contributions to Indian Sociology: Special Issue on Conversations on the Anthropocene and Climate Change. 55 (3) pp 307–323.
 2019. ‘Feet on The Ground, Eyes on the Horizon: Anthropology of Environment and Climate Change in India’. In S. Srivastava et al. ed. Critical Themes in Indian Sociology. New Delhi: Sage.
 2018. ‘Ritual at the Cutting Edge: Everyday Animal Slaughter as Practice and Symbol’. In L.Choukroune and P. Bhandari ed. Exploring Indian Modernities : Ideas and Practice. UK: Springer.
 2018. ‘Courting Resilience: The National Green Tribunal, India’. UNRISD: Working Paper 2018–4.
 2017. ‘The Visual Culture of Meat Shop Signs in Delhi’. In U.Skoda and B.Lettmann ed. India and its Visual Cultures: Community, Class and Gender in Symbolic Landscape. NewDelhi: Sage.
 2017. ‘Courting Nature: Advances in Indian Jurisprudence’. In Can Nature Have Rights? Legal and Political Insights ed. Anna Leah Tabios Hillebrecht and María Valeria Berros. RCC Perspectives:  Transformations in Environment and Society. 6: 31–36.
 2016. ‘Animal Rights vs. Bullfights: The Horns of an Indian Dilemma’. Environment & Society Portal, Arcadia Spring 2016, no. 5. Rachel Carson Center for Environment and Society. http://www.environmentandsociety.org/node/7426.
 2015. ‘Punjabi Inscriptions of Kinship and Marriage’. In R. Chatterji ed. Wording the World: Veena Das and Scenes of Inheritance. New York: Fordham.
 2014.  ‘Shaping Land Rights:  Tenurial Class, Lineage and Gender in Malerkotla, India’. Asian Journal of Women’s Studies20 No. 4 (2).
 2013. ‘Not so Boring. Assembling and Reassembling Groundwater Tales and Technologies from Malerkotla, Punjab’. In John Wagner ed. The Social Life of Water. New York: Berghahn Books. Chapter 6.
 2012. CA Forum on Public Anthropology. Comment on John R. Wagner's ‘Water as a Commons Imaginary’ Current Anthropology Vol. 53 (5) October issue.
 2011. ‘Why a Cousin Becomes a Spouse: Elementary, says Levi-Strauss’. In Dipankar Gupta ed. My Favourite Levi-Strauss. Yoda Press, New Delhi. pp. 62–86.
 2011. ‘Flowers and Gender in Contemporary Paris: Reflections on a Visual Study’. Working Paper Series 2011/XIII.European Studies Programme, University of Delhi.

References

Indian sociologists
Delhi University alumni
Living people
21st-century Indian women writers
Academic journal editors
Year of birth missing (living people)